The Cold Summer of 1953 is a 1988 Soviet crime film directed by Aleksandr Proshkin. It was the last film of the Soviet actor Anatoly Papanov.

Plot
As a result of the large-scale Beria's Amnesty of 1953, a large numbers of criminals are freed. They organise gangs and begin to rob, kill and rape.

In a small village in the north of Russia live two exiles: former military intelligence captain Sergei Basargin (nicknamed "Luzga") and former engineer Nikolai Pavlovich Starobogatov ("Kopalych"). Both have been unjustly imprisoned and then exiled by Stalin's regime.

The village is attacked by a gang of criminals. The bandits kill the only policeman and take the entire population hostage.

The deaf-mute cook Lydia sends her young daughter Shura away to the forest. A young bandit, mad with lust, overtakes Shura and tries to rape her, but Luzga appears and kills him with a shiv. Now armed with his pistol, Luzga ventures further into the forest, where an old bandit Mikhalych is seen having a conversation with Kopalych about the recent downfall of Beria. Mikhalych notices approaching Luzga and shoots at him over Kopalych's shoulder. Lightly wounded Luzga falls down, faking dead, then suddenly shoots and kills Mikhalych. Later he picks off one more bandit.

The rest of the gang, armed with machine guns, mount an all-out attack. Luzga orders Kopalych to create a diversion and implores him to take proper cover. However, Kopalych stands upright to make the diversion more convincing, and is shot dead. Luzga guns down the bandits.

In the evening, as the villagers are collecting the bodies of dead bandits, one body is missing. One of the bandits was only wounded, hid in the bushes, and then killed Shura. Luzga runs after the bandit in the dark and kills him with bare hands.

Some time later, Luzga is seen walking the streets of Moscow. He visits the relatives of Kopalych (who were forced to renounce him after his arrest) and recounts the story to them.

Cast
 Valeriy Priyomykhov as  Sergey Basargin, former military intelligence captain
 Anatoli Papanov as Nikolai Pavlovich Starobogatov, former engineer (Papanov's last role)
 Viktor Stepanov as policeman Mankov, killed by the bandits 
 Nina Usatova as Lydia Matveevna, mute cook
 Zoya Buryak as Shura, Lydia's daughter
 Yury Kuznetsov as Ivan Zotov, director of the trading post
 Vladimir Kashpur as  Fadeich, director of the wharf
 Elizabeth Solodova as Nikolai Starobogatov's wife
 Boris Plotnikov as Nikolai Starobogatov's son
 Vladimir Golovin as professional criminal, gang leader
 Sergey Vlasov as Witek, criminal
 Andrew Dudarenko as Mikhalych, criminal
 Alexander Zavyalov as Mukha, criminal
 Alexey Kolesnik as Hook, criminal
 Viktor Kosykh as Baklan, criminal

References

External links

 

1988 films
1988 crime drama films
Films set in 1953
Films about the Soviet Union in the Stalin era
Soviet crime drama films
Russian crime drama films
Works about the Gulag